Modigliana is a comune (municipality) in the Province of Forlì-Cesena in the Italian region Emilia-Romagna, located about  southeast of Bologna and about  southwest of Forlì.

From 1850 until 1986 Modigliana Cathedral was the seat of the diocese of Modigliana

Modigliana borders the following municipalities: Brisighella, Castrocaro Terme e Terra del Sole, Dovadola, Marradi, Rocca San Casciano, Tredozio.

References

External links

 Official website

Cities and towns in Emilia-Romagna